Andrei Cherkasov was the defending champion, but  lost to Cédric Pioline in the quarterfinal.Marc Rosset won in the final 6–2, 6–2 against Carl-Uwe Steeb.

Seeds

Draw

Finals

Top half

Bottom half

External links
 Draw

Kremlin Cup
Kremlin Cup